Senokos may refer to:
Bulgaria
 Senokos, Blagoevgrad Province
 Senokos, Dobrich Province
North Macedonia
 Senokos, Dolneni
 Senokos, Vrapčište
Serbia
 Senokos, Dimitrovgrad